Tabou may refer to:
 Tabou Department
Tabou, Ivory Coast, town and sub-prefecture, seat of the Tabou Department in the Bas-Sassandra District
 Tabou Airport
 Le Tabou, a jazz club in Paris (France)

See also 
 Taboo
 Taboo (disambiguation)
 Tabu